Events in the year 2012 in Burkina Faso.

Incumbents 

 President: Blaise Compaoré
 Prime Minister: Luc-Adolphe Tiao

Events

January 
January 16 – The government of Tajikistan creates formal diplomatic relations with Burkina Faso.
January 20 – 3 People are imprisoned for killing vultures, a protected species, in order to gather materials for voodoo rites, with the courts looking to set an example of the consequences of vulture killings.

March 
March 7 – The IRC and FIU come to an agreement to expand sustainable water delivery in the country.
March 8 – 136 police officers in the capital are fired for a mutiny committed by the perpetrators the previous year.

May 
May 25 – 25 people in total are killed along the Burkina Faso-Mali border as the Fulani nomads and Malian Dogon farmers fight over use of land.
May 26 – Throughout the country, thousands of people protest against the rise in the cost of basic necessities, such as food and petrol.

September 
September 18 – The Cities Alliance plans for urban upgrading projects for the capital city, Ouagadougou.

November 
November 22 – 400 child trafficking victims, involved in a plot to source child labor, are rescued by Interpol.

December 
December 5 – 2 prominent journalists are sentenced to prison by the Burkinabé government for reporting on a claim of obstruction of justice by the state prosecutor.
December 20 – The British government sets to send aid to ease hunger crisis of countries in the Sahel region.

Deaths

References 

 
2010s in Burkina Faso
Years of the 21st century in Burkina Faso
Burkina Faso
Burkina Faso